Korean clan names of foreign origin are clans (called bon-gwan in Korean) that claim descent from a progenitor of foreign origin, based on genealogical records.

Authenticity
The ancestral origins of many Korean clan names of foreign origin cannot be historically verified outside of a clan's own genealogical records: the ones from the Joseon period, as well as several from the Goryeo period, can be considered historical and factual, but the ones dating before the Goryeo period are impossible to confirm. The adoption of clan names and progenitors of Chinese origin was rare during the Three Kingdoms and Later Silla periods, but increased during the Goryeo period, despite clans not having actual historical connections to China, due to admiration and emulation of Chinese culture. There were some Korean clans that had an actual progenitor of Chinese origin, but many others made ancestral connections to China without any historical basis; most Korean clans that claim descent from Jizi, the Han dynasty, or immigrants from China during the Three Kingdoms or Later Silla periods are not supported by historical records and were founded mostly by Goryeo people. This phenomenon of linking clans to a progenitor of Chinese origin without any historical basis continued into the Joseon period. Korean clans originating from the Song, Yuan and Ming dynasties that immigrated during the Goryeo period have ample details to support a Chinese origin, unlike pre-Goryeo clans.

In South Korea, there are a total of 286 Korean family names, roughly half of which are of foreign origin (mostly Chinese), and 4,179 clan names (bon-gwan). Out of the 286 Korean family names, the top 10 account for 64.1 percent of the population of South Korea: of those 10, three lay claim to a progenitor of Chinese origin, and account for 5.8 percent of the population. However, according to Jin Guanlin, the ancestral origins of those three family names of Chinese origin are "nearly impossible" to verify. Although many Korean clans claim to be of Chinese origin, the number of legitimately foreign Korean clans (i.e. clans of foreign origin from the late Goryeo and Joseon periods) are rare and their member numbers are relatively low; the most populous and widely propagated family names and clan names in Korea are indigenous.

Criticism
According to historian Han Hong-koo of Sungkonghoe University, "About 40 to 50 percent of Korean family names are probably 'naturalized family names', but to say that there are actually that many naturalized families is not true. The book that contains the most lies is probably the jokbo (genealogy book)." Han continues that 100 years ago, only 15 to 20 percent of Koreans were registered in genealogy books, but today genealogy books have become completely ubiquitous.

Immigration
According to Jin Guanlin, "It can be said that from the end of the Chinese Warring States period to the Northern and Southern Dynasties, many Chinese moved to Manchuria and the Korean peninsula, blended among the indigenous people, and over time forgot about their Chinese origins." Many scholars came from China during the Western and Eastern Jin, Northern and Southern dynasties, Sui, and Tang periods. Large-scale immigration from China diminished greatly during the Later Silla period, but resumed during the Goryeo period by people escaping turmoil in China. Many northern Chinese fled to Korea during the transition period between Yuan and Ming. There was little immigration from China during the first half of the Joseon period, but many Han Chinese settled in Korea during the Imjin War as well as during the fall of Ming. Many scholars came from the Ming to escape the Qing during the 17th century.

According to Park Cheol-hee of Gyeongin National University of Education, 238,000 immigrants naturalized during the Goryeo period. Among them, many naturalized Han Chinese became bureaucrats thanks to their knowledge in international affairs and literature, and naturalized Balhae people made great achievements during the Goryeo–Khitan War against the Liao dynasty. Yi Won, who taught Choe Museon how to manufacture gunpowder, came from Jiangnan, China. Naturalized Jurchens of the Goryeo period reported on the state of the North, constructed fortresses, and some attained high government positions through military achievements, such as Go Yeol. Yi Seong-gye, the founder of the Joseon dynasty, was born in the northeast region and supported by the Jurchens of the region, such as Yi Ji-ran, who contributed to the founding of Joseon and played an important role in improving relations between Joseon and Jurchens of the Northeast.

Approximately 18 clans were founded by people of various ethnicities from the Yuan dynasty accompanying Mongol princesses who came to Goryeo to marry Korean kings. Many Jurchens and Manchus immigrated to Korea and established clans, according to Goryeo and Joseon records, but in modern times only one clan continues to claim Jurchen ancestry. Records from the History of Goryeo and the Annals of the Joseon Dynasty reveal that Japanese immigrants became naturalized in 999, 1012, 1039, 1425, 1426, and 1435; they were bestowed Korean clan names, but most of them have been lost.

China 

 Andong Jang clan
 Anum Seomun clan
 Aphae Jeong clan
 Bonghwa Geum clan
 Boseong Seon clan
 Cheongju Yang clan
 Chogye Byeon clan
 Chogye Joo clan
 Chungju Choe clan
 Chungju Ji clan
 Chungju Mae clan
 Chungju Yoo clan
 Dalseong Bin clan
 Dalseong Ha clan
 Damyang Guk clan
 Danyang U clan
 Deoksan Hwang clan
 Gaeseong Ro clan
 Gangeum Dan clan
 Ganghwa Man clan
 Ganghwa Noh clan
 Ganghwa Wi clan
 Gangneung Yoo clan
 Geochang Shin clan
 Geochang Yoo clan
 Geoje Ban clan
 Geumseong Beom clan
 Goksan Yeon clan
 Goseong Lee clan
 Gwangdong Jin clan
 Gyeongju Ping clan
 Gyeongju Seop clan
 Haeju Oh clan
 Haeju Seok clan
 Haengju Eun clan
 Haengju Ki clan
 Haepyeong Gil clan
 Haman Jo clan
 Hamjong Eo clan
 Hampyeong Mo clan
 Hamyang Yeo clan
 Hamyeol Namgung clan
 Hangju Hwang clan
 Hanam Jeong clan
 Hoesan Gam clan
 Hoideok Hwang clan
 Hwangju Hwangbo clan
 Hyeonpung Gwak clan
 Hyoryong Sagong clan
 Icheon Seo clan
 Iljik Son clan
 Imgu Pung clan
 Jaeahn Hwang clan
 Jangheung Ma clan
 Jangheung Wi clan
 Jangsu Hwang clan
 Jeju Cho clan
 Jeolgang Jang clan
 Jeolgang Pyeon clan
 Jeolgang Seo clan
 Jeolgang Si clan
 Jeonju Chu clan
 Jenam Wang clan
 Jindo Kim clan
 Jinju Hyong clan
 Juksan Ahn clan
 Juksan Eum clan
 Kaesong Pang clan
 Gwangcheon Dong clan
 Nangya Jeong clan
 Miryang No clan
 Miryang Dang clan
 Mokcheon Ma clan
 Mungyeong Jeon clan
 Musong Yu clan
 Naju Na clan
 Namwon Dokgo clan
 Namyang Bang clan
 Namyang Hong clan
 Namyang Seo clan
 Okcheon Yuk clan
 Onyang Bang clan
 Paju Yeom clan
 Pareung Cho clan
 Pareung Ho clan
 Pungcheon Im clan
 Punggi Jin clan
 Pyeonghae Gu clan
 Pyeonghae Hwang clan
 Pyeongtaek Im clan
 Gokbu Gong clan
 Sangju Hwang clan
 Sangju Joo clan
 Sangsan Lee clan
 Seochok Myeong clan
 Seongju Hwang clan
 Seosan Jeong clan
 Sanggok Ma clan
 Sinan Joo clan
 Sinchang Maeng clan
 Sincheon Kang clan
 Sinpyong Ho clan
 Suan Gye clan
 Suwon Baek clan
 Soju Ga clan
 Taean Lee clan
 Taein Gyeong clan
 Taewon Jang clan
 Taewon Kim clan
 Taewon Lee clan
 Taewon Sunwoo clan
 Tosan Gung clan
 Dureung Du clan
 Uiheung Ye clan
 Uiryeong Nam clan
 Uiryeong Ok clan
 Wonju Byeon clan
 Wonju Won clan
 Yangju Nang clan
 Yangsan Jin clan
 Yeoheung Min clan
 Yeonan Lee clan
 Yeonan Myeong clan
 Yeongcheon Hwangbo clan
 Yeongwol Eom clan
 Yeongyang Cheon clan
 Yeongyang Nam clan
 Yeoyang Jin clan
 Namyang Gal clan
 Yonggung Gok clan
 Gimpo Gong clan
 Yeongyang Gim clan
 Goksan No clan
 Jangyeon No clan
 Gyoha No clan
 Hampyeong No clan
 Angang No clan
 Gwangju No clan
 Andong No clan
 Yeonil No clan
 Pungcheon No clan
 Yeongsan Shin clan
 Suncheon Do clan
 Seongju Do clan
 Jinju Dongbang clan
 Cheongju Dongbang clan
 Gwangnyeong Muk clan
 Gwangju Mo clan
 Yodong Muk clan
 Taewon Bang clan
 Muan Bang clan
 Jangyeon Byeon clan
 Hwangju Byeon clan
 Cheongju Sa clan
 Chungju Seok clan
 Pyeongsan So clan
 Jinju So clan
 Namyang Song clan
 Seosan Song clan
 Yeosan Song clan
 Eunjin Song clan
 Indong Jang clan
 Gwangsan No clan
 Yonggang Paeng clan
 Muncheon Gong clan
 Hongsan Sun clan
 Namwon Seung clan
 Pungsan Sim clan
 Gu Juksan An clan
 Taewon An clan
 Tongju Yang clan
 Gyeongheung Eo clan
 Uiryeong Yeo clan
 Hwiju Yo clan
 Musong Yun clan
 Haeju Yun clan
 Gyeongju Yun clan
 Goesan Eum clan
 Pyeongsan Lee clan
 Gyodong In clan
 Jangheung Im clan
 Yoyang Ja clan
 Asan Jang clan
 Chirwon Je clan
 Namyang Jegal clan
 Baecheon Jo clan
 Imcheon Jo clan
 Yeongam Jong clan
 Jeju Jwa clan
 Gwangsan Tak clan
 Goksan Han clan
 Goesan Pi clan
 Hongcheon Pi clan
 Danyang Pi clan
 Hamyang O clan
 Dongbog O clan
 Boseong O clan
 Gunwi O clan
 Gochang O clan
 Naju O clan
 Nagan O clan
 Jangheung O clan
 Goseong Nam clan
 Hwasun O clan
 Pyeonghae O clan
 Hampyeong O clan
 Ulsan O clan
 Heungyang O clan
 Yeonil O clan
 Yeongwon O clan

Uyghur 
 Gyeongju Sol clan
 Imcheon Lee clan
 Deoksu Jang clan

Jurchen 
 Cheonghae Lee clan

Vietnam 
 Hwasan Lee clan	
 Jeongseon Lee clan

Mongolia 
 Yonan In clan

Arab 
 Deoksu Jang clan

Japan 
 Urok Kim clan
 Hambak Kim clan
 Mangjeol
 Hwangmok
 Hwasun Song clan
 Songjin Jeup clan
 Goesan Jeom clan

India 
 Incheon Lee clan
 Gimhae Heo clan
 Taein Heo clan
 Hayang Heo clan
 Yangcheon Heo clan

Netherlands 
 Byeongyeong Nam clan

United States 
 Seoul Kang clan
 Yeongdo Ha clan

Russia 
 Guri Shin clan

Notes

References

External links 
 

Korean-language surnames
Korean clans